Venganellur  is a village in Thrissur district in the state of Kerala, India.
Areas of Interests:Venganellur Sivakshethram is an ancient temple dedicated to Siva in the form of Thiruveembilappan under control of Cochin Devaswam Board, Trissur. Chakiar koothu is conducted regularly here in Medam month for 30 days. Ashtami in Vrishchikam and Shivarathri are the main festivals being celebrated at this temple. Thalikulam (a pond near this temple) believed to be created by the foot step of Hanuman when he landed here while bringing Mrita sanjeevani to Lakshmanan. The 'Vela' of Venganellur Desam starts from here to Anthimahakalan Temple as part of the festival.
NMLP School is the school which offers public instruction. The headquarters of Venganellur Service Cooperative Bank is at Venganellur.

Demographics
 India census, Venganellur had a population of 10431 with 4930 males and 5501 females.

References

Villages in Thrissur district